Dave Hope (born October 7, 1949) is an American bass guitarist who played with the American progressive rock band Kansas from 1970 (original version) until the band's first split in 1983. When he was in high school, he played defensive center for his football team as well as performing on the tuba in his high school band. Through both activities he became friends with many of the members who are still part of the band today. When he was in Kansas, he was known for his signature handlebar mustache and his nickname to many was "Smokin' Dave," as he was usually photographed with a cigarette dangling from his lips.

After the band's split, Hope started the Christian band AD with Kerry Livgren and others. In 1990, a German promoter decided to reunite the original Kansas band for a special European tour. Everyone but Robby Steinhardt returned. The band decided to tour America as the original lineup again, but Hope left the band. In 2000, Kerry Livgren of Kansas reunited the original lineup for the Kansas album Somewhere to Elsewhere. The band members included were original band members Steve Walsh, Robby Steinhardt, Rich Williams, Kerry Livgren, Dave Hope, and Phil Ehart, and the band's current bass player, Billy Greer.

Today, Hope is a retired Anglican priest.  He retired from Immanuel Anglican Church, a member congregation of the Anglican Mission in America, in Destin, Florida in 2013, where he was the head of Worship, Evangelism and Outreach. He is currently the bassist for the local rock band "The Mulligans". Dave is still close with the members of Kansas and has been known to play the encore of their shows when he attends. He is also husband to Diana Hope and father to Zoie Hope.

Hope is also the author of a commentary on the Gospel of Luke, "Looking at Luke Through the Eyes of Hope".

Discography of Dave Hope

Discography with Kansas
Kansas (1974)
Song for America (1975)
Masque (1975)
Leftoverture (1976)
Point of Know Return (1977)
Two for the Show (1978)
Monolith (1979)
Audio-Visions (1980)
Vinyl Confessions (1982)
Drastic Measures (1983)
Somewhere to Elsewhere (2000)

Discography with Kerry Livgren
 Time Line (1984, credited as "Kerry Livgren AD")
 Art of the State (1985, credited as "AD")
 Reconstructions (1986, credited as "AD")
 Prime Mover (1988, credited as "Kerry Livgren AD")
 Reconstructions Reconstructed (1997, credited as "Kerry Livgren AD")
 Prime Mover II (1998, credited as "Kerry Livgren")

Discography with Ad Astra
Beyond Our Bounds (2008)

References

1949 births
Living people
Musicians from Topeka, Kansas
American rock bass guitarists
American male bass guitarists
Kansas (band) members
Progressive rock bass guitarists
American Episcopal priests
Guitarists from Kansas
American male guitarists
20th-century American guitarists
AD (band) members